Love Is You may refer to:

Love Is You (EP), an EP by Cherry Belle
"Love Is You", a 1977 single by Carol Williams covered by Sophie Ellis-Bextor in 2018
Love Is You, a 1987 album by Barrett Strong
"Love Is You", a 1987 song by BeBe Winans with Marvin Winans
"Love Is You", a 2008 single by Thomas Godoj